KV Dhillon is an Indian music and film producer, and owner of Geet MP3 a music company and Slay King (Clothing Brand).  He has produced the films like Sikander 2, Shooter, Jatt Brothers and Lover.

Career 
Dhillon is the owner of Punjabi music company Geet MP3 and Slay King(Clothing Brand). He started his career with producing Yaar Beli in 2016. 
After this, he produced various Punjabi songs like Lehanga (song), Prada, Nira Ishq, Mil Lo Na, Phulkari, Billian Billian, Suit Punjabi, Jhanjra and Splendor. 
In 2019 he produced the film Sikander 2.
In 2022 he produced the film Shooter , Jatt Brothers, Kaka Pradhan and Lover.

Filmography

References

External links

Living people
Punjabi film producers
Indian record producers
1991 births